Charbati Mosque, is a Tunisian mosque located in the south of the medina of Tunis, in El Hajjamine Hood in the Bab Jazira suburb.
It is known for its Sahih al-Bukhari recital every Sunday.

Localization

The mosque is located in El Hajjamine Street, near Bab Jedid, one of the medina's gates.

Etymology
According to the commemorative plaque, it got its name from its founder cheikh El Charbagi.

History

According to the commemorative plaque at the entrance, the mosque was built in 1933 during the Husainid era.
Then, it was restored under the orders of Ahmad II of Tunis, one of the beys of Tunis, and thanks to the funds of Ahmed Ben Haj Mohamed.
It was restored again in 2012 .

References 

Mosques in Tunis
Mosques completed in 1933